The Porterville Comets were the last minor league baseball team that operated out of Porterville, California. They played in the Southwest International League in 1952 and were an all-black baseball team. Previously the Porterville Packers played in the Sunset League in 1949–1950 and the Porterville Orange Pickers played in the San Joaquin Valley League in 1911.

External links
 Baseball Reference
Article about the ballpark

Defunct Southwest International League teams
Defunct Sunset League teams
Defunct San Joaquin Valley League teams
Professional baseball teams in California
Defunct baseball teams in California